Robert Cranston can refer to:

 Robert Cranston (boxer) (1928–2014), an Indian Olympic boxer
 Robert Cranston (Scottish politician) (1843–1923), a Lord Provost of Edinburgh
 Robert B. Cranston (1791–1873), a U.S. Representative from Rhode Island